James Davenport (October 12, 1758 – August 3, 1797) was an eighteenth-century American lawyer, politician and judge. He served as a U.S. Representative from Connecticut.

Biography
Davenport was born in Stamford in the Connecticut Colony, the son of Abraham Davenport, and Elizabeth (Huntington) Davenport. He graduated from Yale College in 1777. He served in the commissary department of the Continental Army in the American Revolutionary War. He served as judge of the court of common pleas and was a member of the Connecticut House of Representatives from 1785 to 1790. Davenport served in the Connecticut State Senate from 1790 to 1797, and was a member of the Connecticut council of assistants from 1790 to 1796.

He was a judge of the Fairfield County Court from 1792 until 1796. He was elected as a Federalist candidate to the Fourth Congress to fill the vacancy caused by the resignation of James Hillhouse, and was reelected to the Fifth Congress. Davenport served in Congress from December 5, 1796, until his death in Stamford on August 3, 1797.

Personal life
Davenport married Abigail Fitch on May 7, 1780. They had one daughter together, Elizabeth Coggshall Davenport. Davenport married his second wife Mehitable Coggshall on November 6, 1790. Davenport had three daughters with Mehitable, Abigail Fitch Davenport, Mary Ann Davenport and Frances Louise Davenport.

Davenport's uncle, also named James Davenport, was a noted clergyman. Davenport's brother John Davenport also served in the United States Congress.

According to the 1790 Census, Davenport was the owner of 10 slaves, making him one of the largest slaveholders in Fairfield County at the time.

See also
List of United States Congress members who died in office (1790–1899)

References

External links

1758 births
1797 deaths
Members of the Connecticut General Assembly Council of Assistants (1662–1818)
Members of the Connecticut House of Representatives
Yale College alumni
Politicians from Stamford, Connecticut
Federalist Party members of the United States House of Representatives from Connecticut
18th-century American politicians